Vicki Wysocki is an American scientist. She is a professor and an Ohio Eminent Scholar at Ohio State University, and also the Director of the Campus Chemical Instrument Center.

Education 
Vicki Wysocki received a BS in chemistry from Western Kentucky University in 1982. She received a PhD in chemistry at Purdue University in 1987, under the supervision of R. Graham Cooks. She did post-doctoral work at Purdue University and at the US Naval Research Laboratory as a National Research Council Fellow.

Career 
Wysocki became an Assistant Professor at Virginia Commonwealth University in 1990, and an Associate Professor in 1994. In 1996, she continued her career at University of Arizona, and she was promoted to Professor in 2000. She was the Chair of the Department of Chemistry and Biochemistry at University of Arizona. She is a Professor and an Ohio Eminent Scholar at Ohio State University, and the Director of the Campus Chemical Instrument Center.

She was the treasurer (1998–2000), vice president for programs (2014–2016), president (2016–2018) and past president (2018–2020) of the American Society for Mass Spectrometry. She served on the editorial board of Analyst, and she served as an associate editor of Analytical Chemistry. She serves as the Editor-in-Chief of the Journal of the American Society for Mass Spectrometry, she serves on the Honorary Board of International Journal of Mass Spectrometry.

Awards 

 2022 International Mass Spectrometry Foundation Thomson Medal Award 
 2022 American Chemical Society Division of Analytical Chemistry Award in Chemical Instrumentation
 2021 The Analytical Scientist The Power List 
 2019 The Analytical Scientist The Power List 
 2019 German Mass Spectrometry Society (Deutsche Gesellschaft für Massenspektrometrie, DGMS) Wolfgang Paul Lecture 
 2017 American Chemical Society Frank H. Field and Joe L. Franklin Award for Outstanding Achievement in Mass Spectrometry
 2013 Purdue University Department of Chemistry Outstanding Alumni Award 
 2009 American Society for Mass Spectrometry John B. Fenn Award for a Distinguished Contribution in Mass Spectrometry
1992 American Society for Mass Spectrometry Research Award

References

External links
 

Purdue University alumni
Living people
Mass spectrometrists
Ohio State University faculty
Year of birth missing (living people)
American women chemists
American women academics
21st-century American women